Microbulbifer aestuariivivens is a Gram-negative, aerobic and non-motile bacterium from the genus of Microbulbifer which has been isolated from tidal flat sediments from the South Sea in Korea.

References

External links
Type strain of Microbulbifer aestuariivivens at BacDive -  the Bacterial Diversity Metadatabase

Alteromonadales
Bacteria described in 2017